Sevastopolskaya is a rural locality (a stanitsa) in Abadzekhskoye Rural Settlement of Maykopsky District, Russia. The population was 608 as of 2018. There are 13 streets.

Geography 
The stanitsa is located in the upper reaches of the river Fyuntv, 27 km southeast of Tulsky (the district's administrative centre) by road. Novosvobodnaya is the nearest rural locality.

References 

Rural localities in Maykopsky District